This article lists the main target shooting events and their results for 2012.

World Events

Olympic & Paralympic Games
The 2012 Olympic Games & 2012 Paralympic Games were held in London, United Kingdom.
 Shooting at the 2012 Summer Olympics – Qualification
 Shooting at the 2012 Summer Olympics
 Shooting at the 2012 Summer Paralympics – Qualification
 Shooting at the 2012 Summer Paralympics

International Shooting Sport Federation
 3–9 June: 2012 World Running Target Championships held in Stockholm, Sweden.

ISSF World Cup
 2012 ISSF World Cup

International Practical Shooting Confederation
 2012 IPSC Shotgun World Shoot held in Debrecen, Hungary

FITASC
2012 Results.

Regional Events

Africa

Americas

Asia

Asian Shooting Championships
 12–18 December: 2012 Asian Airgun Championships held in Nanchang, China.
 11–22 January: 2012 Asian Shooting Championships held in Doha, Qatar.
 28 November – 9 December: 2012 Asian Shotgun Championships in Patiala, India.

Europe

European Shooting Confederation
 16–19 February: 2012 European 10 m Events Championships held in Vierumäki, Finland.
 19–25 May: 2012 European Shotgun Championships in Larnaca, Cyprus.

"B Matches"
 4–6 February: InterShoot in Den Haag, Netherlands.
 RIAC held in Strassen, Luxembourg.

National Events

United Kingdom

NRA Imperial Meeting
 July, held at the National Shooting Centre, Bisley.
 Queen's Prize winner: 
 Grand Aggregate winner: 
 Ashburton Shield winners: Wellington College
 Kolapore Winners: 
 Junior Kolapore Winners: Sydney City, 
 National Trophy Winners: 
 Elcho Shield winners: 
 Vizianagram winners: House of Commons

NSRA National Meeting
 August, held at the National Shooting Centre, Bisley.
 Earl Roberts British Prone Champion:

USA
 2012 NCAA Rifle Championships, won by TCU Horned Frogs.

References

 
2012 in sports